Patakino is a rural locality (a selo) in Vtorovskoye Rural Settlement, Kameshkovsky District, Vladimir Oblast, Russia. The population was 137 as of 2010. There are 2 streets.

Geography 
Patakino is located on the Klyazma River, 15 km southwest of Kameshkovo (the district's administrative centre) by road. Mostsy is the nearest rural locality.

References 

Rural localities in Kameshkovsky District
Vladimirsky Uyezd